Oil City is an unincorporated community located in Yazoo County, Mississippi.

Oil City has a zip code of 39040.

In 1939, the Tinsley Oil Field was discovered west of the settlement, which prompted a minor oil boom.  In Oil City, "streets and commercial buildings" were "sold to optimistic business interests and speculators." However, development never materialized.

Residents are within the Yazoo County School District. Residents are zoned to Yazoo County Middle School and Yazoo County High School.

References

Unincorporated communities in Yazoo County, Mississippi
Unincorporated communities in Mississippi